FedEx Express Flight 14 was a scheduled cargo flight from Singapore to Newark, New Jersey, via Malaysia, Taiwan, and Alaska. On July 31, 1997, the aircraft flying this route crashed during landing on its final segment at Newark International Airport (EWR), inverting and catching fire, injuring all five people on board.

Summary
Flight 14 crashed while landing on runway 22R at Newark Airport on July 31, 1997.  The flight originated in Singapore with intermediate stops in Penang, Malaysia, followed by Taipei, Taiwan, and then Anchorage, Alaska.  In addition to the Captain and First Officer there were three passengers on board, including one riding in the jump seat.

During the flight, the pilots were concerned that they would have little stopping distance after landing, and the captain said that he wanted to put the aircraft down early on the runway. The aircraft had departed with one thrust reverser (on the left engine) inoperative, and the pilots knew of incidents in the aircraft's maintenance log where the auto-brakes had failed to activate during landings. They had also misinterpreted the runway data, and so believed they had less stopping distance than was actually available.

The landing was normal until the beginning of the flare phase. The MD-11 touched down, bounced, and rolled to the right. On the second touchdown, about  later, the right gear snapped and the No. 3 engine (right wing engine) contacted the runway, with the right roll continuing until the right wing spars broke. The aircraft came to rest off the right side of the runway, on its back, and on fire. All five occupants escaped through a cockpit window.  The airplane was destroyed by fire.

Aircraft and crew

The aircraft, named Joshua by FedEx, construction number 48603 and line number 553, was a McDonnell Douglas MD-11F freight model, powered by three General Electric CF6-80C2D1F engines. Registered in the United States as  the aircraft was delivered new to FedEx in September 1993. Prior to the crash, the aircraft had a total of 13,034 flight hours and 2,950 flight cycles (a flight cycle is defined as a takeoff and landing), and had been involved in two prior incidents. In January 1994, when it sustained underbelly damage during a bounced landing at Memphis International Airport. Then in November 1994, the aircraft was involved in a tailstrike at Anchorage International Airport. Permanent repairs were made from the Anchorage incident within days of the tailstrike, and permanent repairs to the Memphis incident were made at the next C check in August 1995.

The captain was 46-year-old Robert M. Freeman who joined FedEx in 1988 when it bought Flying Tiger Line, which he had previously worked for since 1978. Freeman had logged a total of 11,000 flight hours, including 1,253 hours on the MD-11. The first officer was 39-year-old Donald E. Goodin, who had been with FedEx since 1994, having served as a former U.S. Air Force pilot from 1977 to 1994 and had 3,703 flight hours, though only 592 of them were with FedEx. Goodin only had 92 hours on the MD-11.

Investigation
The National Transportation Safety Board (NTSB) conducted a full investigation of the accident and concluded that the probable cause was the captain's over-control of the aircraft during the landing and his failure to go around after a destabilized flare. These last control inputs were "too late and too large" to stabilize the landing, and the plane's high sink rate and rightward roll compressed the right landing gear strut at the second touchdown, which broke the right wing rear spar and ruptured the right fuel tank.

NTSB safety recommendations

As a result of its investigation of this accident, the NTSB made new recommendations based on their findings and conclusions to improve the safety of operations of the MD-11 type aircraft including that the FAA develop new pilot training tools to "include information about factors that can contribute to structural failures involving the landing gear, wings, and fuselage, such as design sink rate limits; roll angle limits; control inputs' roll rate; pitch rate; single-gear landings; the effect of decreased lift; and structural loading consequences of bottoming landing gear struts and tires; provide a syllabus for simulator training on the execution of stabilized approaches to the landing flare, the identification of unstabilized landing flares, and recovery from these situations, including proper high sink rate recovery techniques during flare to landing, techniques for avoiding and recovering from overcontrol in pitch before touchdown, and techniques for avoiding overcontrol and premature derotation during a bounced landing; and to promote an orientation toward a proactive go-around."

Aftermath 
For his role in the accident, Captain Freeman was fired from FedEx on October 30, 2000. However, the FedEx pilot union criticized the decision and announced that they would appeal it, citing that the crash was caused by aircraft design flaws.

Flight number 
FedEx Express continues to use Flight 14 as an active flight number today; the route has been modified to originate in Hong Kong, with the stop in Taipei before continuing on to Anchorage and Memphis as destination.

Media 
The crashes of FedEx Express Flight 14, and a similar crash in 2009 of another McDonnell Douglas MD-11, FedEx Express Flight 80 at Narita International Airport in Japan, are both covered on Season 14 of Mayday (Air Crash Investigation, Air Disasters), episode 5, titled "The Final Push".

See also 
 Lufthansa Cargo Flight 8460 – an MD-11 that bounced and broke up on landing in 2010
 FedEx Express Flight 80 – an MD-11 that bounced and flipped on landing in 2009
 China Airlines Flight 642 – an MD-11 that landed hard and broke up in 1999
 List of accidents and incidents involving commercial aircraft

References

External links

 NTSB investigation docket

 

Airliner accidents and incidents in New Jersey
Accidents and incidents involving the McDonnell Douglas MD-11
Airliner accidents and incidents caused by pilot error
Aviation accidents and incidents in New Jersey
Newark Liberty International Airport
14
1997 in New Jersey
Aviation accidents and incidents in the United States in 1997
July 1997 events in the United States
FedEx